Belnem is a private community on the island of Bonaire. It is luxurious neighbourhood named after Harry Belafonte and Maurice Neme. Construction of Belnem started on 3 June 1966.

History
Harry Belafonte often visited and liked the Caribbean island of Bonaire. Belafonte together with Maurice Neme of Oranjestad, Aruba embarked on a joint venture to create a luxurious private community on Bonaire.

On 3 June 1966, the construction of the neighbourhood started which was named Belnem after Belafonte and Neme. At least 30 houses with a minimum size of 100 m2 and a road connecting the neighbourhood to the road network of Bonaire had to be constructed within a two-year time period. The neighbourhood is managed by the Bel-Nem Caribbean Development Corporation. Belafonte and Neme served as its first directors. Later, other residential neighbourhoods were built in Belnem. In 1981, Belnem came under scrutiny by the Island Council, because the land which had been sold to Belnem at a reduced price was being sold on at high prices.

Bachelor's Beach
Bachelor's Beach is a small beach near Belnem. It can be accessed via stairs down the  cliff. It is one of the most popular beaches and is located near Flamingo International Airport with planes passing over the beach.

References

Beaches of Bonaire
Populated places in Bonaire